Malinik (Serbian Cyrillic: Малиник) is a mountain in eastern Serbia. Its highest peak, Veliki Malinik has an elevation of 1,158 metres above sea level. Smaller peak, Mali Malinik, is 1019 m.

The most prominent features of Malinik are the spectacular Lazar's Gorge (Lazarev kanjon) of the eponymous river, carved almost vertically in the mountain's karst masif; and Lazar's Cave (Lazareva pećina) near the village of Zlot.

References

Mountains of Serbia